John L. Hart House in Hartsville, South Carolina, also known as Hart-Mills Cottage, was built in 1850. It was listed on the National Register of Historic Places in 1983.  It is located in the East Home Avenue Historic District.

References

Houses on the National Register of Historic Places in South Carolina
Houses in Darlington County, South Carolina
National Register of Historic Places in Darlington County, South Carolina
Houses completed in 1850
Historic district contributing properties in South Carolina